The Mü-27  is a research glider aircraft that designed and built in  Germany in 1979. Only one example was constructed.

Development 
Germany had established Akademische Fliegergruppe at several universities after World War I. The first and lead group was established in Berlin, but one of the most prolific, up to World War II, was Akaflieg München, and design activities continued after World War II.

The Akaflieg München Mü-27 is a two-seat research aircraft intended to explore the performance characteristics of slotted Fowler flaps when used on a high-performance Sailplane. The  Mü-27 is a large glider. The empennage and fuselage are constructed of glassfibre re-inforced plastic with conticell foam sandwich cores throughout. The wings have aluminium alloy spars and webs.

The full-span slotted flaps/ailerons extend and retract in and out of the wing trailing edge, increasing the area of the wings by up to 36%. A tall retractable undercarriage and a T-tail reduce the risk of damage during field landings and reduce drag when in flight. Flight trials commenced at Oberpfaffenhofen airfield with Thomas Fischer at the controls.

Specifications (Mü-27)

See also
List of gliders

References

Coates, Andrew. “Jane's World Sailplanes & Motor Gliders new edition”. London, Jane's. 1980.

External links

sailplanedirectory

1970s German sailplanes
Mu26
T-tail aircraft
Aircraft first flown in 1979